State Highway 19, abbreviated as SH-19, is a  highway running through the southern part of the U.S. state of Oklahoma. It is signed east–west.

Route description

SH-19 begins at an intersection with US-283 in Blair, Oklahoma. SH-19 heads east from Blair for 23 miles (37 km) without intersecting another highway before meeting U.S. Highway 183 north of Roosevelt. It continues eastward, sharing a 3-mile (4.8 km) section of road with State Highway 54 before splitting off to the east and briefly overlapping with SH-115 and State Highway 58.

The next town Highway 19 encounters is Apache, north of Lake Ellsworth, where it crosses U.S. Highway 62/281. Nine miles (14½ km) later, it overlaps with U.S. Highway 277 at Cyril. These two overlap with US-81 near Ninnekah, but SH-19 splits off to the east once again within 3 miles (4.8 km).

After splitting off, SH-19 travels in a southeast direction to have a brief concurrency with State Highway 76 through Lindsay. 10 miles (16 km) later it intersects with State Highway 74 at a four-way stop in Maysville. Still continuing southeast, 10 miles (16 km) later it has an interchange with Interstate 35 and an intersection with U.S. Highway 77 in Pauls Valley.

After passing through the Pauls Valley area, SH-19 crosses U.S. Highway 177 west of Stratford, Oklahoma. It then ends, concurrent with SH-3W at the Richardson Loop outside of Ada.

Spurs
SH-19 has two lettered spurs.

 SH-19C runs for one mile (1.6 km) from SH-19 to Alex. It was commissioned on August 7, 1950.
 SH-19D runs for one mile (1.6 km) from SH-19 to Bradley.

Junction list

References

External links
SH-19 at OKHighways

019
Ada, Oklahoma
Transportation in Jackson County, Oklahoma
Transportation in Kiowa County, Oklahoma
Transportation in Caddo County, Oklahoma
Transportation in Grady County, Oklahoma
Transportation in Garvin County, Oklahoma
Transportation in Pontotoc County, Oklahoma